Associação Cultural e Desportiva Potyguar Seridoense, commonly known as Potyguar de Currais Novos or Potyguar Seridoense, is a Brazilian football club based in Currais Novos, Rio Grande do Norte state. They competed in the Copa do Brasil once.

History
The club was founded on August 1, 1989. Potyguar de Currais Novos won the Campeonato Potiguar Second Level in 2007. They competed in the Copa do Brasil in 2010, when they were eliminated in the First Round by Paysandu.

Achievements

 Campeonato Potiguar Second Level:
 Winners (2): 2007, 2012

Stadium

Associação Cultural e Desportiva Potyguar Seridoense play their home games at Estádio Municipal Coronel José Bezerra. The stadium has a maximum capacity of 2,000 people.

References

Association football clubs established in 1989
Football clubs in Rio Grande do Norte
1989 establishments in Brazil